Hervé Niquet (born 28 October 1957) is a French conductor, harpsichordist, tenor, and the director of Le Concert Spirituel, specializing in French Baroque music.

Biography 
Born on 28 October 1957, Hervé Niquet was raised at Abbeville in the department of Somme. He studied harpsichord, composition, conducting, and opera singing. In 1980, he was appointed as the choir master of the Opéra National de Paris. Between 1985 and 1986, Niquet became a member of Les Arts florissants as a tenor, the ensemble that William Christie founded. In 1987, he established his own ensemble named "Le Concert Spirituel" which focuses on French grand motets of the 17th and 18th centuries.

Recordings 
Accord, Adda
 André Campra Vol.1 Te Deum. Motets 	Niquet (Adda 581250) no reissue
 André Campra Vol.II Requiem. Benedictus Dominus. Niquet (Accord)
 André Campra Vol.III Deus noster refugium. Cantate Domino. Messe ad majorem. De profundis. Niquet (Accord) 92
 Rossini: La cambiale di matrimonio
 Joseph Bodin de Boismortier. Grand Motet. 6 Motets a voix seul
 Jean Gilles (composer). Motet à St Jean-Baptiste. 'Cantate Jordanis Incolae'.  Niquet 1989 (Accord)
 Jean Gilles. Te Deum. Diligam te Domine	Niquet (Accord)

Naxos
 Paolo Lorenzani, Motet pour les confesseurs, Litanies à la Vierge, Antienne à la Vierge, Dialogue entre Jesus et l'âme, with Le Concert Spirituel (1997)
Jean-Baptiste Lully, grands motets. 3 vols. (reissued Naxos)
 Joseph Michel 1688–1736 Lecons de Ténèbres 	Niquet 1997
 Joseph Bodin de Boismortier. Serenades francaises Niquet (Naxos)
 Joseph Bodin de Boismortier. Don Quichotte chez la Duchesse
 Joseph Bodin de Boismortier. Ballets de Village
 Marc-Antoine Charpentier (1643–1704):
1994 : Messe des Morts à quatre voix H.7, Pie Jesu H.263, De profundis H.213, Litanies de la Vierge H.89, Transfige dulcissime Jesu H.251, Confitebor tibi H.220, Nisi Dominus H.160, H.160 a, Laudate pueri Dominum H.203, H.203 a, with Le Concert Spirituel, CD Naxos (Vol. 1) 10 de Répertoire.
1995 : "Vespers of the Blessed Virgin", Beatus vir H.221, Laudate pueri H.149, Lauda Jerusalem H.210, Laetatus sum H.216, Nisi Dominus H.150, Ave Maris stella H.60, Magnificat H.72, Salve Regina à 3 choeurs H.24, with Le Concert Spirituel, CD Naxos (Vol. 2)
1996 : Te deum H.147, Messe H.1, Precatio pro Regis H.166, Panis quem ego dabo H.275, Domine salvum fac regem H.281, Canticum Zachariae H.345, with Le Concert Spirituel, CD Naxos (Vol.3)
1998 : Magnificat H.76, Litanies de la Vierge H.83, Quatre antiennes à la Vierge H.44-47, Prière à la Vierge H.367, Pro omnibus festis H.333, Petit motet pour la Vierge H.30, Chant joyeux du temps de Pâques H.339, with Le Concert Spirituel, CD Naxos  (Vol. 4)
 Louis-Nicolas Clérambault :
Le Triomphe d'Iris (1706) (Naxos)
 2 Cantatas : Orphée, Léandre et Héro, + sonatas 	Piau/Niquet (Naxos)
 2 Cantatas : La Mort d'Hercule, Polipheme, + symphonias	Coadou/Niquet 96 (Naxos)
 Orazio Benevoli. Missa Azzolina. Magnificat. Dixit Dominus. Laetatus sum
 Jean-Nicolas Geoffrey. Messe pour les fetes doubles. Memento Domine Davi. Regina coeli
 Emmanuel Chabrier. España, Suite pastorale, Habanera, Danse slave and Fête polonaise from Le roi malgré lui, Lamento, Prélude pastoral and Joyeuse marche.
 Paolo Lorenzani. Motet pour les confesseurs.

Glossa
 Joseph Bodin de Boismortier. Daphnis et Chloe (2CD)	Niquet (Glossa Lorraine)
 Joseph Bodin de Boismortier. Sonates pour basses
 François d' Agincourt. Pièces D'Orgue 
 François d’ Agincourt Pieces de Clavecin Dediees a la reine Niquet
 2001: Henry Purcell's Dido and Æneas, with Le Concert Spirituel and Glossa.
 2003: Georg Friedrich Haendel's Water Music & Fireworks with Le Concert Spirituel and Glossa.
 2003: Henri Desmarets' Grands Motets, vol. 1, with Le Concert Spirituel and Glossa.
 2004: Henry Purcell's King Arthur, with Véronique Gens, Hanna Bayodi, Béatrice Jarrige, Cyril Auvity, Joseph Cornwell, Peter Harvey, Le Concert Spirituel and Glossa.
 2004: Joseph Bodin de Boismortier's Sonates pour basses, with Le Concert Spirituel and Glossa.
 2005: Henri Desmarets' Grands Motets, vol. 2, with Le Concert Spirituel and Glossa.
Marc-Antoine Charpentier :
 2002: 3 Leçons de ténèbres H.135, H.136, H.137, 5 Méditations pour le Carême H.380, H.381, H.386, H.387, H.388, with Le Concert Spirituel (Glossa)
 2002: Messe de Monsieur de Mauroy H.6, Domine Salvum Fac Regem H.299, with Le Concert Spirituel (Glossa)
2006: Messe à huit voix H.2, Domine Salvum Fac Regem H.283 & Te Deum à huit voix H.145, with Le Concert Spirituel (Glossa)
 2009: Missa Assumpta est Maria H.11, Domine Salvum Fac Regem H.303 & H.291, with Le Concert Spirituel (Glossa)
2007: André-Cardinal Destouches's Callirhoé, with Cyril Auvity, Stéphanie d'Oustrac, João Fernandes, Le Concert Spirituel, and Glossa.
 2007: Marin Marais's Sémélé, with Shannon Mercer, Jaël Azzaretti, Bénédicte Tauran, Hjördis Thébault, Anders J. Dahlin, Thomas Dolié, Marc Labonnette, Lisandro Abadie, Le Concert Spirituel and Glossa.
 André Campra. Le Carnaval de Venise Opéra-ballet. Paris, 1699
 André Grétry. Andromaque
 Jean-Baptiste Lully. Proserpine. Quinault 1680
 Pierre Bouteiller. Missa pro defunctis, Sébastien de  Brossard Stabat Mater Le Concert Spirituel, Hervé Niquet
 Alessandro Striggio. Missa "Ecco si Beato Giorno"
 Louis Le Prince. Missa Macula non est in te, Charpentier, Motets H.306, H.341, H.245, H.299, (Ouverture H.536), Lully, O dulcissime Domine (2013)
Prix de Rome, Ediciones singulares
 Camille Saint-Saëns. Music for the Prix de Rome
 Claude Debussy. Music For The Prix de Rome. Le Gladiateur; Invocation; La Damoiselle élue; Printemps;
 Gustave Charpentier. Music for the Prix de Rome
 Max d'Ollone. Music for the Prix de Rome
Other
 Ferdinand Hérold. Piano concertos 2-4. Jean-Frederic Neuburger, Sinfonia Varsovia, Hervé Niquet. Mirare
 François Cosset. Missa Super Flumina Babylonis. Atma
 Jean Philippe Rameau. Pygmalion (Acte de Ballet) Le Temple de la Gloire. Virgin
 Jean Philippe Rameau. In convertendo, Virgin
 Orazio Benevoli. Missa Si Deus Pro Nobis, Magnificat, Alpha

References

External links 
 The official site of Le Concert Spirituel
 Herve Niquet – Biography and work at Naxos
 A review of debut recording of Orazio Benevoli's Missa Si Deus Pro Nobis, Magnificat

People from Abbeville
1957 births
French male conductors (music)
French harpsichordists
French performers of early music
French operatic tenors
Living people
21st-century French conductors (music)
21st-century French male musicians
20th-century French conductors (music)
20th-century French male musicians